Call It Love is the fourth studio album by American musician Briana Marela. It was released in August 2017 under Jagjaguwar.

Track listing

Accolades

References

2017 albums
Jagjaguwar albums